Jonathan Ernest Pim PC (1858–1949), was an Irish lawyer and judge, and Liberal politician.

He was born in Dublin, eldest son of Thomas Pim of Greenbank; of the Dublin branch of the celebrated Quaker family which co-founded the town of Mountmellick. His grandfather, also called Jonathan Pim, served as an MP for Dublin City between 1865 and 1874. He graduated from the University of Dublin in 1881 and entered Gray's Inn in 1882. He was called to the Irish Bar in 1886 and became King's Counsel in 1909.

Pim served in the Liberal administration of H. H. Asquith as Solicitor-General for Ireland from 1913 to 1914. The latter year he was sworn of the Irish Privy Council and promoted to Attorney-General for Ireland, a position he held until 1915, when he was appointed a justice of the King's Bench Division of the High Court of Justice in Ireland. After the Easter Rising of 1916 he was briefly appointed a Lord Justice of Ireland, charged with emergency powers of government.

After the establishment of the Irish Free State, like nearly all the pre-independence judges he was required to retire under the Courts of Justice Act 1924. He was a member of the Royal Irish Academy.

Maurice Healy in his memoir The Old Munster Circuit suggests that Pim's retirement probably came as a relief to him, since despite his great charm, courtesy and erudition he was not a lawyer of adequate calibre for any of the offices he filled, and he had not expected to be appointed to any more senior office than a county court judge.

Pim died in 1949.

References

External links
 

1858 births
1949 deaths
Solicitors-General for Ireland
Attorneys-General for Ireland
Members of the Privy Council of Ireland
Alumni of Trinity College Dublin
Members of Gray's Inn
Judges of the High Court of Justice in Ireland
Irish barristers